The 2003 season of the Tonga Major League was the 25th season of top flight association football competition in Tonga. Lotohaʻapai United won the championship for the sixth time, the 6th in a record streak of 11 titles in the Tonga Major League.

Standings

Results
Matches were played on a single round robin basis.

References

Tonga Major League seasons
Tonga
Football